McClurg Branch is a stream in Iron County in the U.S. state of Missouri. It is a tributary of Cedar Creek.

The stream valley is also known as Coon Hollow. The confluence is just south of Missouri Route 32 about one mile east of the community of Banner. Belleview is about five miles to the east.

McClurg Branch has the name of Jake McClurg, an early settler.

See also
List of rivers of Missouri

References

Rivers of Iron County, Missouri
Rivers of Missouri